Torodora parallactis is a moth in the family Lecithoceridae. It was described by Edward Meyrick in 1894. It is found in Burma.

Adults are similar to Torodora characteris, but the anterior blotch is triangular, more distinctly connected with the inner margin, followed by some whitish-ochreous scales, the posterior spot absent, replaced by two transversely placed whitish-ochreous dots. The hindwings are paler.

References

Moths described in 1894
Torodora